Liispõllu is a village in Kastre Parish, Tartu County, Estonia. In 2000 Liispõllu had a population of 13.

References

Villages in Tartu County